The women's team archery event was one of 4 archery events at the 2018 Mediterranean Games.

Schedule
All times are local (GMT+2).

Results

Qualification round

Competition bracket

References

External links
Qualification round results
Final round brackets

Archery at the 2018 Mediterranean Games
2018 in women's archery